Movie Critters' Big Picture is a family feature movie that stars muppet style characters. The 80-minute feature follows Benny Gopher as he leaves the farm in order to make it big in show business. Movie Critters' Big Picture takes the entire family on a hilarious journey via amazingly life lie puppets, songs, satire, and parody.

The audience visits Sunshine pictures "Hollywood's Brightest Studio' and are introduced to some of the biggest names in show business including Arnold Hamandegger, Cary Ant, Frankie Sinatrat, and the rest of the Rat Pack, Charlie Chimplin, Jay Rhino, Gloria Swansong, and more.

Benny Gopher is so focused on making it in Tinsel Town that the truth sometimes takes a back seat. Through Benny's struggle with conscience, the audience learns about the importance of being honest.

The film is produced, directed, and written by Steven F. Zambo. The Co-Producer is Michael J. Krahn. The Associate Producer is Ted Lecher.

Awards 
Movie Critters' Big Picture received the Dove Foundation Seal of Approval, three Telly Awards, the Aurora Awards, and the Film Advisory Seal of Approval.

External links 
  at moviecritters.com
 
 http://www.tapeworm.com

2003 television films
2003 films
2003 comedy films